Harry C. "Buddy" Melges Jr. (born January 26, 1930) is a competitive sailor. He has earned national and international championships in several classes in conventional sailing and ice-boating.

Early life
Born in Elkhorn, Wisconsin, Melges grew up on Lake Geneva, Wisconsin, sailing the boats designed and manufactured by his father, Harry Melges Sr. Based in Zenda, Wisconsin, Melges Performance Sailboats is still in operation, and is now run by Buddy's son, Harry Melges III.

Sailing career
Melges is an Olympic gold (Soling, 1972) and bronze (Flying Dutchman, 1964) medalist, a two-time Star world champion (1978 and 1979), a three-time 5.5 Meter world champion (1967, 1973 and 1983), a five-time E-Scow national champion (1965, 1969, 1978, 1979 and 1983), a seven-time skeeter ice boat world champion (1955, 1957, 1970, 1972, 1974, 1980 and 1981) and a three-time Yachtsman of the Year (1961, 1972 and 1978). He helped Bill Koch steer his America3 to a successful defense of the America's Cup in 1992.ref name="sports-reference" />

Melges was inducted into the America's Cup Hall of Fame in 2001, and to the Inland Lake Yachting Association Hall of Fame in 2002. He was inducted into the National Sailing Hall of Fame in 2011. Melges lectures and teaches across the United States, and is a member of many yacht clubs. He has been characterized as the "Grand Master" of competitive yachting, and has been called "The Wizard of Zenda".

References

External links
 
 
 

1930 births
Living people
American male sailors (sport)
People from Elkhorn, Wisconsin
People from Lake Geneva, Wisconsin

1987 America's Cup sailors
1992 America's Cup sailors
2000 America's Cup sailors

Medalists at the 1964 Summer Olympics
Medalists at the 1972 Summer Olympics
Olympic bronze medalists for the United States in sailing
Olympic gold medalists for the United States in sailing
Sailors at the 1964 Summer Olympics – Flying Dutchman
Sailors at the 1972 Summer Olympics – Soling

North American Champions Soling
World champions in sailing for the United States
Star class world champions
World Champions in 5.5 Metre

US Sailor of the Year